Deon Godfrey Meyer is a South African thriller novelist, writing in Afrikaans. His books have been translated into more than 20 languages. He has also written numerous scripts for television and film.

Life and career
Meyer was born on 4 July 1958 in Paarl.  He matriculated in 1976 at the Schoonspruit High School in Klerksdorp. He studied at Potchefstroom University for Christian Higher Education where he studied for a BA with English and History as majors.  He later obtained an honours degree at the University of the Free State.  He was a long-time resident of historical coastal resort of Melkbosstrand where he wrote most of his novels.

In the 1980s he worked as a journalist at Die Volksblad, at the public relations office of the University of the Free State, and began work as advertising copy writer at Sanlam. In 1991 he was appointed manager of Internal Communication and creative director of Sanlam's Publicity department. After leaving Sanlam he started his own business specialising in the creation and management of virtual communities on the internet. He then worked as manager of special projects at BMW motorcycles. He currently writes full-time. His hobbies include touring Southern Africa on a motorcycle

Novels 
Deon Meyer's novel-writing career started when the Afrikaans magazine, Huisgenoot, published a short story he had submitted. Since then he has published eleven novels and two collections of short stories. His novels reflect current social issues in South Africa, including that of the apartheid system. His main characters are flawed but empathetic cops.

Bibliography
 (1994) Wie met vuur speel
 (1996) Feniks                                      (English title: Dead Before Dying — published in 1999)
 (1997) Bottervisse in die jêm: 13 kortverhale      (A collection of thirteen short stories)
 (1998) Orion (also dramatised for television)      (English title: Dead at Daybreak — published in 2000)
 (2000) Proteus                                     (English title: Heart of the Hunter — published in 2003)
 (2007) Onsigbaar                                   (English title: Blood Safari — published in 2009)
 (2009) "Transito" (series written for television)
 (2010) Karoonag en ander verhale                   (A collection of short stories)
 (2010) Spoor                                       (English title: Trackers — published in 2011)
 (2016) Koors                                      (English title: Fever — published in 2017)

Benny Griessel series
 (2004) Infanta  (English title: Devil's Peak — published in 2007)
 (2008) 13 Uur  (English title: Thirteen Hours — published in 2010)
 (2011) 7 Dae  (English title: Seven Days — published in 2012)
 (2013) Kobra  (English title: Cobra — published in 2014)
 (2015) Ikarus  (English title: Icarus — published in 2015)
 (2017) Die vrou in die blou mantel (English title: The Woman in the Blue Cloak - published in 2018)
 (2018) Prooi (English title: The Last Hunt — published in 2019)
 (2020) Donkerdrif (English title: The Dark Flood — published in 2021)

Film and television rights awarded for novels
 Feniks (Dead Before Dying) was the first novel for which film rights were awarded. The screenplay, written by South African writer Johann Potgieter, was finalised in 2008 but was never made into a motion picture. It was adapted again in 2015 by German TV-producer Annette Reeker as Cape Town, an international co-produced TV-series.
 In August 2009 the film rights for 13 Uur (Thirteen Hours) were awarded to British producers Malcolm Kohll and Robert Fig. Roger Spottiswoode was appointed to direct the film.
 The film rights for Proteus (Heart of the Hunter) were granted to a South African company.
 "Transito" was specially written for television. The novel Orion was dramatised for television.
 The 2019 South African TV series Trackers is based on Meyer's 2011 novel of the same name. It premiered in the US on June 5, 2020.
 Devil's Peak, the first Benny Griessel novel, is being adapted as a five episode TV series for M-Net, with Hilton Pelser starring as Griessel.

Awards and nominations
Meyer has been nominated for and has won numerous awards.

Blood Safari

 Won the inaugural ATKV Prize for Best Suspense Fiction in 2008.
 German Title (Weisser Schatten ) received the German Krimi Award (third place) in 2009.

Dead at Daybreak

 French title (Les Soldats de l'aube) won the French Prix Mystère de la critique 2004.
 Awarded best television script for a South African series by the Afrikaanse Taal en Kultuurvereniging in 2007
 Swedish title (Död i gryningen) was shortlisted for the Martin Beck Award for best translated crime fiction in 2008.
 Afrikaans title (Orion) won the ATKV Prose Prize for 2000 and was shortlisted for the M-Net Book Prize.
 Shortlisted for The Sunday Times Literary Prize.

Dead Before Dying
 French title (Jusqu'au Dernier ) won Le Grand Prix de Littérature Policière 2003.
Devil's Peak
 Won the Martin Beck Award ("Den gyllene kofoten" or The golden crowbar) by the Swedish Academy of Crime Writers in 2010.
Afrikaans Title (Infanta) won ATKV Prose Prize for 2004.
 French Title (Le pic du diable ) won the Readers' Award from CritiquesLibres.com for Best Crime Novel or Thriller in 2010.
Heart of the Hunter
 Afrikaans title (Proteus ) won the ATKV Prose Prize for 2003.
German title (Das Herz des Jägers) won Deutscher Krimi Preis in 2006.
13 Hours won the ATKV Prize for Best Suspense Fiction in 2009 and the Exclusive Books Boeke Prize (Exclusive Books Fanatics choice) 2011.
Seven Days
 Afrikaans title (7 Dae) won the M-Net Literary Award (Film category) in 2012.

References

External links
 Author's Web Site
 Human & Rousseau Publishers
 Shotsmag Ezine Review "Thirteen Hours"
 2008 Interview in Shotsmag Ezine
 2012 Interview on Crimezone.nl
 
 Facebook Page

South African male novelists
South African crime fiction writers
Afrikaner people
People from Paarl
Crime fiction writers
1958 births
Living people
Barry Award winners
University of the Free State alumni